Mercer House is a historic house in Natchez, Mississippi. It was built circa 1820. It has been listed on the National Register of Historic Places since August 9, 1979.

References

Houses on the National Register of Historic Places in Mississippi
Federal architecture in Mississippi
Victorian architecture in Mississippi
Houses completed in 1819
Houses in Adams County, Mississippi